is a 2016 Japanese animated action-adventure film directed by Shinpei Ezaki, written by Taku Kishimoto and based on the video game Monster Strike by Mixi and Yoshiki Okamoto. It is a prequel and sequel to the ONA anime series of the same name. It was released in Japan by Warner Bros. on 10 December 2016. The film was eventually released on DVD and Blu-ray in Japan on April 19, 2017, as well as a limited edition.

Plot

It's a prequel story to the main events of the first season.

Cast
Maaya Sakamoto as Ren Homura (young) 
Tomo Muranaka as Haruma Kagutsuchi (young) 
Lynn as Aoi Mizusawa 
Juri Kimura as Minami Wakaba 
Kengo Kawanishi as Akira Kagetsuki 
Jun Fukushima as Oragon 
Yūsuke Kobayashi as Ren Homura 
Nana Mizuki as Arthur 
Kōichi Yamadera as Genome 
Kin'ya Kitaōji as Kentarō Ishibashi

Box office

Notes

References

External links
 

2016 anime films
2010s action adventure films
Action anime and manga
Adventure anime and manga
Anime films based on video games
Animated action films
Animated adventure films
Japanese action adventure films
Liden Films
Ultra Super Pictures
Warner Bros. films